Curryville is an unincorporated community in Blair County, Pennsylvania, United States. Curryville has a post office with ZIP code 16631.

Demographics

References

Unincorporated communities in Blair County, Pennsylvania
Unincorporated communities in Pennsylvania